The Sony Ericsson P1 is a smartphone and the successor of the P990. It was the last of the Sony Ericsson "P" Smartphone series, introduced in 2002 with the Sony Ericsson P800 and it integrates many of the hardware features of its predecessor the P990 in the form factor of the M600. It was announced on 8 May 2007. There is a Chinese version of P1 called P1c. Compare with P1/ P1i, P1c lacks of 3G, thereby using EDGE which is much slower but more available especially in the US and parts of Europe.

The phone uses the UIQ 3.0 software platform, which is based upon Symbian OS 9.1. It is slightly thicker than the M600 as a result of the new hardware features, but this is reportedly largely indiscernible. It is nonetheless considerably thinner than the P990 (25% smaller - as the official press review states).

Key improvements
As a result of its increased RAM, the P1's multitasking performance is more stable than that of the first batch of UIQ 3 phones from Sony Ericsson (P990, M600 and W950). The boot speed, when compared to the P990, is also discernibly faster.

The P1 uses the form factor of the M600 and consequently shares its screen size of 2.6 inches, making it 0.2 inches smaller than its predecessor. However, due to the new transflective layer on its LCD display, legibility under direct sunlight has been improved on the P1. This addresses a common problem faced by owners of the P990.

The phone has 256 MB of ROM; twice as much as its predecessor. The P1 also has 160 MB of built in storage, which can be expanded by up to 16 GB using its Memory Stick Micro slot.

Main features 

 3.15 MP camera with autofocus, Video - QVGA 320x240 15fps, LED flash, 3X digital zoom, Business Card Scanning and Picture Blogging
 Rocker QWERTY Keyboard with two letters sharing on one key (key pressed left for one letter and right for the other letter)
 Video Telephony (uses both front and back cameras)
 256 MB Flash, 160 MB user free memory
 128 MB RAM (79 MB free on startup)
 Symbian OS v9.1 UIQ 3.0
 512 MB Memory Stick Micro (M2) bundled on package
 OptiMobile VoIP client (not included)
 FM Radio with Equalizer & RDS support (AF, TA, NEWS), Gracenote TrackID service
 Enhanced standby screen - can have up to 15 applications shortcuts now, instead of 5 (on P990, M600 and W950 respectively)
 "Record Conversation" is not available
 QuickOffice Document reader and editor, pdf+ reader
 Black list sms and call

Other Business and Multimedia Features 

 Bluetooth stereo (A2DP)
 Media Player
 Melody composer/MIDI (MusicDJ)
 Music tones
 PlayNow

Internet

 RSS feeds
 Web browser Opera Web

Entertainment

 3D games
 Java (not full - without Java ME capture protocol for cameraphone)
 Video Clip
 Video streaming

Connectivity

 3G
 WiFi
 UMTS
 Bluetooth
 Fast port
 GPRS
 Infrared port
 Modem
 USB mass storage
 USB support

Messaging

 Email
 BlackBerry (push e-mail)
 MMS (Multimedia Messaging)
 Predictive text input
 Push email
 SMS long (Text Messaging)
 Sound recorder (does not work during call)
 Track ID

Communication

 Conference calls
 Speakerphone
 Vibrating Alert
 VideoPhone (FaceTime)

Design

 Jog Dial
 Picture wallpaper
 Animated Screensaver

Organiser

 Alarm clock (only on turned on phone)
 Business card exchange
 Calculator
 Calendar
 Document editors
 File manager
 Flight mode
 Handwriting recognition
 Notes
 Phone book
 Stopwatch
 Tasks
 Timer
 Touch-screen

Networks 
UMTS / GSM 900 / GSM 1800 / GSM 1900
3G 384 kbit/s
Wi-Fi 802.11b 11Mbit/s

Top ranking in Greenpeace report 
The P1 model was rated among the most green phones 2007, alongside the Sony Ericsson T650i and Nokia N95 in the report Searching for green electronics

References

External links 
 Sony Ericsson P1i official page 
 Sony Ericsson P1c official page 
 Launch photos on All About Symbian 
 Sony Ericsson P1 resource
 P1 vs P990 boot speed test
 Sony Ericsson P1i review

Sony Ericsson smartphones
UIQ 3 Phones
Mobile phones introduced in 2007
Mobile phones with infrared transmitter